Tom vs Time is an American documentary series created by Gotham Chopra that was released from January 25 to March 12, 2018 on Facebook Watch. The six-episode series follows New England Patriots quarterback Tom Brady and provides an intimate look at his off-season training regimen as well as his home life spent with wife Gisele Bündchen and their children.

Premise
Tom vs Time was filmed during the Patriots 2017 season and provides "an intimate look at Brady’s home life, including his two children with wife Gisele Bündchen."

Production

Development
On January 9, 2018, it was announced that Facebook Watch had given a series order to Tom vs Time, a new docuseries starring football quarterback Tom Brady. The series was created by Gotham Chopra who previously worked with Brady on Audience Network's Religion of Sports series. Brady granted Chopra extensive access to his life. It was announced that episodes are set to include footage shot at Brady's Brookline, Massachusetts home, with his children and wife, Gisele Bündchen, on family retreats to Costa Rica, on a trip to Montana (with teammates Julian Edelman and Danny Amendola), on a summer tour of China with his son Jack, and in the car during Brady’s commute to and from work in Foxborough, Massachusetts.

Following the Patriots' loss to the Philadelphia Eagles in Super Bowl LII, the release of the series finale was delayed. Chopra went on to explain that the episode had originally been "tied to the Pats winning the Super Bowl" and that following their defeat the episode had to be redeveloped. The episode was finally released on March 12, 2018.

Marketing
Simultaneously with the initial series announcement, Facebook released a trailer for the first season of the show.

Potential renewal
Chopra has indicated that there are currently no plans for any subsequent season. However, he considers it a possibility if "something is dramatically different." He went on to say that if Brady's circumstances changed or the production team came up with a new, worthwhile idea then another season could happen but that they would not produce one "just because."

Episodes

See also
 List of original programs distributed by Facebook Watch

References

External links
 
 

Facebook Watch original programming
2010s American reality television series
2018 American television series debuts
2018 American television series endings
English-language television shows
American non-fiction web series
Tom Brady